Atholi is a village in Phagwara in Kapurthala district of Punjab State, India. The village is administered by a sarpanch, an elected representative of the village.

Demography 
In 2011, the village had 287 houses and a population of 1,342 (705 males, 637 females). According to the report published by Census India in 2011, of the population of the village, 547 were from Scheduled Caste and the village did not have any Scheduled Tribe population.

See also
List of villages in India

References

External links 
 Tourism of Punjab
 Census of Punjab

Villages in Kapurthala district